Asota heliconia is a moth in the family Erebidae. It is found from the Indo-Australian tropics east to Queensland and the Solomons.

The wingspan is 52 mm.

Larvae have been recorded on Averrhoa species.

Subspecies
Asota heliconia atrata (Solomon Islands)
Asota heliconia bandana (Kayao island, Banda Elat)
Asota heliconia clavata (China, India, Myanmar, Thailand, northern Vietnam)
Asota heliconia dama (Australia, New Zealand)
Asota heliconia dicta (China, Indonesia, Malaysia, Philippines)
Asota heliconia doryca (Indonesia, Papua New Guinea )
Asota heliconia enganensis (Enggano)
Asota heliconia ghara (Kai Islands)
Asota heliconia heliconia (China, India, Indonesia, Malaysia, Papua New Guinea, Taiwan)
Asota heliconia intacta (Indonesia)
Asota heliconia kalaonica (Sulawesi)
Asota heliconia kiriwinae (Trobiand Island)
Asota heliconia lanceolata (Sulawesi)
Asota heliconia latiradia (Babar island)
Asota heliconia leuconeura (Indonesia, Papua New Guinea)
Asota heliconia malisa (Indonesia)
Asota heliconia natunensis (Indonesia)
Asota heliconia nicobarica (Nicobar Islands)
Asota heliconia perimele (Indonesia)
Asota heliconia philippina (Philippines)
Asota heliconia sangirensis (Indonesia)
Asota heliconia semifusca (Papua New Guinea, Solomon Islands)
Asota heliconia timorana (East Timor, Indonesia)
Asota heliconia toekangbesiensis (Tomea island)
Asota heliconia unicolor (Indonesia)
Asota heliconia venalba (Andaman Islands)
Asota heliconia zebrina (Taiwan)

External links
 The Moths of Borneo
 heliconia heliconia info at http://www.aganainae.nl

Aganainae

Asota (moth)
Moths described in 1758
Taxa named by Carl Linnaeus
Moths of Australia
Moths of Asia
Moths of Indonesia
Moths of Japan
Moths of Malaysia
Moths of Borneo
Moths of New Zealand
Moths of Papua New Guinea
Moths of the Philippines
Moths of Taiwan